Shekhar Saxena, MD, FRCPsych, DAB, MRC, Psych, since 1998 has worked at the World Health Organization (WHO) and since 2010 has been the Director of the Department of Mental Health and Substance Abuse (MSD) at World Health Organization's Headquarters Office in Geneva, Switzerland.  He is recipient of the 2017 Leon Eisenberg Award.  In September 2018 joined the Harvard T.H. Chan School of Public Health as visiting professor of Global Mental Health in the Department of Global Health and Population.

Education
 MD, Psychiatry - All India Institute of Medical Sciences, Delhi, India (AIIMS)
 Medical residency - All India Institute of Medical Sciences, Delhi, India (AIIMS)

Career
Before joining WHO in 1998 and moving to Geneva, Saxena served as a clinical psychiatrist to patients in Delhi, India. One of the organizations he worked for was the All India Institute of Medical Sciences. He has worked with many major European and North American research and academic institutions, including the National Institutes of Health (NIH) and National Institute of Mental Health in the United States and has been interviewed widely on television and radio, including NPR. In 2010, he was appointed the Director of the Department of Mental Health and Substance Abuse.

Some of his work involves the prevention and management of mental, developmental, neurological, and substance use disorders, and suicide prevention. At WHO, he also led the implementation of the organization's mental health Gap Action Programme.

On 9 May 2017, he received the 8th Annual Leon Eisenberg Award at the Harvard Faculty Club in Cambridge, Massachusetts. In June 2018, after 8 years, he stepped down as the Director of the Department of Mental Health and Substance Abuse at WHO.

He is scheduled to speak to the 3rd Global Conference on Health and Lifestyle at Loma Linda University in Loma Linda, California, 9–13 July 2019.

Personal life
Shekhar Saxena is married to Dr. Abha Saxena, Director of Global Health Ethics at the World Health Organization.  She is also a medical doctor, anesthesiologist, and a bioethicist, and together they live in Geneva, Switzerland.  They have two adult daughters no longer living with them.

Recent publications

 Saxena S, Paraje G, Sharan P, Karam G, Sadana R. The 10/90 divide in mental health research: trends over a ten-year period. Br J Psychiatry 2006; 188: 81–82.

 Prince, M. Patel, V., Saxena, S, Maj, M, Maselko, J., Phillips, MR, Rahman, A. No health without mental health. The Lancet. 4 September 2007.
 Saxena, S, Esparza, P, Regier, DA, Saraceno, B, and Sartorius, N, Eds. Public Health Aspects of Diagnosis and Classification of Mental and Behavioral Disorders: Refining the Research Agenda for DSM-5 and ICD-11.

 Vikram Patel, F. Med. Sci., and Shekhar Saxena, M.D., "Perspective. Transforming Lives, Enhancing Communities—Innovations in Global Mental Health," The New England Journal of Medicine (15 January 2014).
 Evans, T, Marquez, PV, and Saxena, S. (2015). "The zero hour for mental health." The World Bank Blogs, 4 May 2015. Available at http://blogs.worldbank.org/health/zero-hour-mental-health.
 Marquez PV. "Shining a light on mental illness: An 'invisible disability'"? The World Bank Blogs. 2015. Dec 2, 2015. Available at http://blogs.worldbank.org/health/shining-light-mental-illness-invisible-disability;
 Saxena S, and Marquez, PV.  Making Mental Health a Global Priority.  Chapter 8 in Glovin, B. Cerebrum 2016: Emerging Ideas in Brain Science.  The Dana Foundation.

 Marquez PV, Saxena S. "Mental Health Parity in the Global Health and Development Agenda" The World Bank Blogs. 2016. 4 Apr 2016. Available at http://blogs.worldbank.org/health/mental-health-parity-global-health-and-development-agenda.

References

External links
Google Scholar research site for Shekhar Saxena's publications
WHO's e-mail contact page for core Mental Health staff

Year of birth missing (living people)
Living people
World Health Organization officials
Indian psychiatrists
21st-century Indian medical doctors
Indian officials of the United Nations
Physicians from Geneva
Medical doctors from Delhi